The 1st constituency of Gard is a French legislative constituency in the Gard département.  It consists of the (pre-2015) cantons of Beaucaire,
Nîmes 1, 3 and
6 and Vistrenque.

Deputies

Election results

2022

 
 
 
 
 
 
 
|-
| colspan="8" bgcolor="#E9E9E9"|
|-

2017

2012

2007

 
 
 
 
 
 
|-
| colspan="8" bgcolor="#E9E9E9"|
|-

2002

 
 
 
 
|-
| colspan="8" bgcolor="#E9E9E9"|
|-

1997

 
 
 
 
 
|-
| colspan="8" bgcolor="#E9E9E9"|
|-

References

Sources
 French Interior Ministry results website: 

French legislative constituencies of Gard